Eritrea is located in the Horn of Africa and is bordered on the northeast and east by the Red Sea, on the west and northwest by Sudan, on the south by Ethiopia, and on the southeast by Djibouti. A coastal plain, western lowlands, and some 350 islands comprise the remainder of Eritrea's land mass.

Climate 
The climate of Eritrea is shaped by its diverse topography and its location within the tropics. 
The diversity in landscape and topography in the highlands and lowlands of Eritrea results in the diversity of climate across the country. The highlands have temperate climate throughout the year. The climate of most lowland zones is arid and semiarid. The distribution of rainfall and vegetation types varies markedly throughout the country. Eritrean climate varies on the basis of seasonal and altitudinal differences. Based on variations in temperature Eritrea can be broadly divided into three major climate zones: a temperate zone, a subtropical climate zone and a tropical climate zone.

Eritrea can be divided into three major climate zones: the central highlands, the coastal region, and the western lowlands. Each has a different climate pattern. According to Köppen climate classification, Eritrea have either a hot semi-arid climate (BSh) or a hot desert climate (BWh), although temperatures are much moderated at the highest elevations.

In the central highlands, the hottest month is usually May to June with highs around 27 °C (80.6 °F) to 30 °C (86 °F). Winter is between December and February with lows at night that can be near freezing point. Asmara itself enjoys a pleasant climate all year round, although it can be quite cold at night in winter. There are two rainy seasons: the short rains in March and April and the main rains from late June to the beginning of September.
Over there, the climate is usually sunny and dry as sunshine durations turn around 3,000 h and averages annual rainfall hover around 500 mm (19.68 in).
 
On the coast along the Red Sea, the summertime is long, from June to September and extremely hot with averages high temperatures ranging from 40 °C (104 °F) to 46 °C (114.8 °F), and it's even hotter in Denkalia. The wintertime is nearly non-existent and averages high temperatures remain above 28 °C (82.4 °F) during the least hot month of the year and averages low temperatures exceed 20 °C (68 °F). The rainy season along the coast north of Denkalia falls during the winter months but rainy days still remain scarce ; rainfall is even more rare in Denkalia Region. The climate is always sunny and dry in this zone and cloudy days are rare.

In the western lowlands, the high temperatures are comparable to those on the coast in the hottest months of April until June. December is the coolest month with averages low temperatures falling as low as 15 °C (59 °F). The rainy seasons are the same as for the highlands.

Data 
Location:
Eastern Africa, bordering the Red Sea, between Djibouti and Sudan, also bordering Ethiopia.

Geographic coordinates: 

Continent:
Africa

Area:
total:
117,600 km2
land:
101,000 km2
water:
16,600 km2

Area - comparative:
slightly smaller than Malawi

Land boundaries:
total:
1,840 km
border countries:
Djibouti 125 km, Ethiopia 1,033 km, Sudan 682 km

Note that the border between Eritrea and Ethiopia is disputed.

Coastline:
2,234 km total; mainland on Red Sea 1,151 km, islands in Red Sea 1,083 km

Maritime claims:
territorial sea: 12 nm

Terrain:
dominated by extension of Ethiopian north-south trending highlands, descending on the east to a coastal desert plain, on the northwest to hilly terrain and on the southwest to flat-to-rolling plains

Ecoregions:
Most of Eritrea's coast is part of the Ethiopian xeric grasslands and shrublands semi-desert ecoregion. The southern part of the Red Sea coast, along with the Red Sea coast of Djibouti, has been described as the Eritrean coastal desert, a harsh sand and gravel coastal strip covered in dune grasses and shrubs that is important as a channel for the mass migration of birds of prey.

Elevation extremes:
lowest point:
near Lake Kulul within the Afar Depression −75 m
highest point:
Soira 3,018 m

Natural resources:
gold, potash, zinc, copper, salt, possibly petroleum and natural gas, fish

Land use:
arable land:
6.83%
permanent crops:
0.02%
other:
93.15% (2012 est.)

Irrigated land:
215.9 km2 (2003)

Total renewable water resources:
6.3 km3

Freshwater withdrawal (domestic/industrial/agricultural):
total:
0.58 km3/yr (5%/0%/95%)
per capita:
121.3 m3/yr (2004)

Natural hazards:
frequent droughts, rare earthquakes and volcanic activity, and locust storms

Environment - current issues:
deforestation; desertification; soil erosion; overgrazing; loss of infrastructure from civil warfare;

Environment - international agreements:
party to:
Biodiversity, Climate Change, Desertification, Endangered Species, Hazardous Wastes, Ozone Layer Protection

Geography - note:
strategic geopolitical position along world's busiest shipping lanes; Eritrea retained the entire coastline of Ethiopia along the Red Sea upon de jure independence from Ethiopia on 24 May 1993.

Extreme points 

This is a list of the extreme points of Eritrea, the points that are farther north, south, east or west than any other location.

 Northernmost point - the point at which the border with Sudan enters the Red Sea, Northern Red Sea region
 Easternmost point - the point at which the border with Djibouti enters the Red Sea, Southern Red Sea Region
 Southernmost point - unnamed location on the border with Djibouti immediately east of the Djiboutian town of Dadda`to, Southern Red Sea Region
 Westernmost point - Abu Gamal mountain, Gash-Barka

References